Hypercompe caudata is a moth of the family Erebidae. It was described by Francis Walker in 1855. It is found in Texas, southern Arizona, Mexico, Costa Rica, Honduras and Nicaragua.

The wingspan is 56 mm for males and 86 mm for females. Adults are on wing in January, April, October and November.

References

 

caudata
Moths described in 1855